Eight ships of the Royal Navy have borne the name HMS Northumberland after the English county of Northumberland, or the Dukedom of Northumberland. Another was planned but later cancelled:

 was a 70-gun third rate launched in 1679. She was rebuilt in 1701 and was wrecked in the Great Storm of 1703.
 was a 70-gun third rate launched in 1705. She was rebuilt from 1719 to 1721, and again from 1741 to 1743 (the last time as a 64-gun ship), and was captured by the French Navy off Ushant in 1744.
 was a 70-gun third rate launched in 1750. She was converted into a storeship in 1777 and renamed HMS Leviathan. She foundered in 1780.
 was a 78-gun third rate captured from the French Navy at the Battle of the Glorious First of June in 1794 and broken up in 1795.
 was a 74-gun third rate launched in 1798, notable as the ship that carried Napoleon to his final exile on the island of Saint Helena in 1815. She was converted to a hulk in 1827 and broken up in 1850.
 was a  ironclad battleship launched in 1866. She became a depot ship in 1898 and was renamed HMS Acheron on becoming a training ship in 1904.  She was converted to a hulk and renamed C8 in 1909, and renamed C68 in 1926. She was sold 1927 and later resold as the hulk Stedmound.
HMS Northumberland was to have been a  heavy cruiser ordered in 1929 but cancelled in 1930.
 is a Type 23 frigate launched in 1992 and currently in service.

Battle honours
Ships named Northumberland have earned the following battle honours:
Barfleur 1692
Vigo 1702
Louisburg 1758
Quebec 1759
Egypt 1801
San Domingo 1806
Groix Island 1812

See also

References

Royal Navy ship names